Otodus is an extinct, cosmopolitan genus of mackerel shark which lived from the Paleocene to the Pliocene epoch.

Description
All species are known from its  fossilized teeth, and four of them (O. obliquus, O. auriculatus, O. angustidens and O. megalodon) are also known from its fossilized vertebral centra. Like other elasmobranchs, the skeleton of Otodus was composed of cartilage and not bone, resulting in relatively few preserved skeletal structures appearing within the fossil record. The teeth of this shark are large with triangular crown, smooth cutting edges, and visible cusps on the roots. Some Otodus teeth also show signs of evolving serrations.

Size estimation
The fossils of Otodus indicate that it was a very large macro-predatory shark. The vertebral centrum of this species are over 12.7 cm (5 inch) wide.

Growth and reproduction
Like the extant great white shark, it is likely that males could have reached sexual maturity earlier than females.

O. angustidens also had a faster growth rate than the extant great white shark, while O. auriculatus and the extant great white shark had a similar growth rate. O. megalodon had a much faster growth rate (nearly two times that of the extant great white), but likely had an extremely delayed sexual maturity based on the result of the study that the slowing or cessation of somatic growth in megalodon occurred around 25 years of age.

Like contemporaneous sharks, at least two species of Otodus (O. angustidens and O. megalodon) made use of nursery areas to birth their young in, specifically warm-water coastal environments with large amounts of food and protection from predators. A possible reproduction area of O. obliquus has been discovered in the Ganntour basin, Morocco.

Distribution
Otodus had a worldwide distribution, as fossils have been excavated from Africa, Asia, Europe, North America, South America, Caribbean and Australia.

Diet
Otodus was likely among the apex predator of its time and commonly preyed upon fish, sea turtles, cetaceans (e.g. whales), and sirenids.

While scavenging behavior cannot be ruled out as a possibility, the placement of the bite marks is more consistent with predatory attacks than feeding by scavenging, as the jaw is not a particularly nutritious area to for a shark feed or focus on. The fact that the bite marks were found on the tooth's roots further suggest that the shark broke the whale's jaw during the bite, suggesting the bite was extremely powerful. The fossil is also notable as it stands as the first known instance of an antagonistic interaction between a sperm whale and an otodontid shark recorded in the fossil record.

Evolution
It is widely believed that the genus originates from a lineage of sharks belonging to the genus Cretalamna, due to strong similarities in tooth morphology. Scientists determined that Otodus evolved into the genus Carcharocles, given substantial fossil evidence in the form of transitional teeth. Some teeth have been excavated from the sediments of the Nanjemoy Formation in Maryland, USA, Ypres clay in Belgium, and western Kazakhstan, which are morphologically very similar to Otodus teeth but with lightly serrated cusplets and a serrated cutting edge. These transitional fossils suggest a worldwide evolutionary event, and support the theory that Otodus eventually evolved into Otodus aksuaticus and thus initiated the Carcharocles lineage. A more recent study of Megalolamna's taxonomic relationships demonstrates the possibility that Otodus needs to include the species sometimes assigned to Carcharocles (i.e., the megatoothed lineage, including megalodon) in order to be monophyletic.

See also
 Prehistoric fish

References

Otodontidae
Paleocene sharks
Eocene sharks
Prehistoric fish of Africa
Fossil taxa described in 1843